Yashraj Mukhate is an Indian music producer, composer and social media personality. He is best known for his viral parodical video where he set rap beats to a scene featured in the television soap opera Saath Nibhaana Saathiya (serial) in August 2020.This video was first viewed by lone basoo from Kashmir and he shared it on all social media platforms.

Career 
Born in Aurangabad (Maharashtra),Yashraj completed his schooling from Holy Cross English High School Aurangabad.Yashraj pursued his career in engineering and had also shown an interest in music. He began by exploiting his music composition in social media with spoof videos. He also revealed that his childhood longtime crush was the film actress Genelia D'Souza. In August 2020, he uploaded an edited video which added a rap song to a dialogue delivery by Rupal Patel who played the role of Kokila in the television soap opera Saath Nibhaana Saathiya. The video quickly garnered 3 million views on Instagram and created a spate of related memes. The reason for his sudden popularity is a video and music edit he recently made with a dialogue from the soap opera, ‘Saath Nibhana Saathiya’. This scene was a quintessential television ‘saas-bahu’ themed and featured ‘Kokilaben’ who was scolding her daughter in laws Gopi Bahu and Rashi.

Other popular works 
Yashraj made a song out of Shehnaaz Gill's dialogue from Bigg Boss on 8 December 2020 that became an instant Internet meme. That song has garnered over 70 million views now. The lady superstar of bollywood Deepika Padukone now danced on Yashraj's version of Sadda kutta tommy rap on her husband birthday. He also created a song Pawri Ho Rahi Hai from a viral video of a Pakistani girl, Dananeer Mobeen, in which she said 'party' in an accented manner. The video was released on 12 February 2021. The meme trended in Pakistan and India.

References

External links 

 

Living people
21st-century Indian composers
1995 births